Mosaic Place (also known as the Moose Jaw Multiplex) is a multi-purpose arena in Moose Jaw, Saskatchewan, Canada. It hosts ice hockey and curling events and is home to the Moose Jaw Warriors of the Western Hockey League. It opened on August 19, 2011 and seats 4,500 spectators. It replaced the Warriors' former arena, the Moose Jaw Civic Centre.

History
By the early 2000s, the Moose Jaw Civic Centre faced criticism that it was too small and not up to standards for the Warriors hockey team. A civic referendum in 2006 approved construction of a new $36.3 million arena, with the city contributing $15 million. Soon after, plans emerged for a more ambitious $61.2 million facility, with $36.5 million coming from the city. A group of citizens sued the city, claiming that the referendum vote in 2006 did not allow the city to spend more than the original amount. The case was dismissed, and civic voters approved the project again in 2009 with a second referendum.

The entire project cost about $61 million, with the city of Moose Jaw paying $34.5 million.  Provincial and federal governments paid $8 million and community fundraising committed to $10 million. Groundbreaking for the new facility took place on July 9, 2009. Ten-year naming rights to the facility were sold to The Mosaic Company for $150,000 per year, beginning in 2011.

Mosaic Place's operational costs are subsidized by the municipality.

Events
Major events hosted by Mosaic Place

2011—Holiday Festival On Ice featuring Kurt Browning, Western Canadian Under-16 Challenge Cup, Subway Series WHL All Stars vs Russian U-20 team.

2012—Paul Brandt, John Mellencamp, Simple Plan, Nitty Gritty Dirt Band, Alice Cooper, Cesar Millan, Moscow Ballet, Capital One Canada Cup of Curling.

2013—Marilyn Manson, FMX Free Style Canadian Championship, Terri Clark, Billy Talent with Sum 41, Marianas Trench with Down With Webster, JUNO Cup, Mötley Crüe with Big Wreck, Carrie Underwood, Tragically Hip, Great Big Sea, Moscow Ballet's Great Russian Nutcracker.

2014—Larry the Cable Guy, Telus Cup – Midget AAA (Major) national hockey championship, Chicago, Alan Jackson, Brad Paisley, Blue Rodeo, Dean Brody with Cassadee Pope, ZZ Top, Back Street Boys with Victoria Duffield, Doobie Brothers, John Fogerty, Avenged Sevenfold, ABBA the tribute, and Holiday Festival on Ice, starring Kurt Browning.

2015—Scotties Tournament of Hearts (national women's curling championship), Counting Crows, Toby Keith, Wiz Khalifa, Tenors, Bret Michaels, Three Days Grace & STYX.

2016—Disturbed, Megadeth, Jeff Dunham, Lord of the Dance, The Price is Right, PBR (Professional Bull Riding) and Meat Loaf.

2020—Scotties Tournament of Hearts (national women's curling championship).

References

External links
 

Buildings and structures in Moose Jaw
Indoor arenas in Saskatchewan
Indoor ice hockey venues in Canada
Western Hockey League arenas
Sports venues in Saskatchewan
Sport in Moose Jaw